Big job may refer to:

 One last big job, a movie cliché in which a team of criminals are gathered together for a final caper that will make their fortunes.
 Big Job, a slang term for feces or defecation.
 Any job that is big.
 The Big Job (film), a 1965 British crime comedy film.
 Big Job (video game)